Baby Blues (lit "Whose hen doesn't lay eggs?") is a Chinese drama produced in Singapore and broadcast in 2005.

Cast
Chen Liping as Chen Qiaohua
Xie Shaoguang as Lan Haishen
Le Yao as Xiao Yao
Zhu Mimi as Liu Fengping
Michelle Chong as Lan Shanhu
Chen Hanwei as Jiang Weijie
Angel Hou as Chen Qiaoyun
Jin Yinji as Yang Shuilian
Allan Wu
Rachell Ng Ting Yi

Nominations

Star Awards 2005

External links
Baby Blues (English)
Official website (Chinese)

Singapore Chinese dramas
2005 Singaporean television series debuts
2005 Singaporean television series endings
Channel 8 (Singapore) original programming